Yago Gandoy Martínez (born 13 April 1999) is a Spanish professional footballer who plays as a midfielder for Deportivo de La Coruña.

Club career
Gandoy was born in A Coruña, Galicia, and joined Deportivo de La Coruña at the age of ten, from Ural CF. He made his senior debut with the reserves on 10 December 2017, coming on as a late substitute for Martín Bengoa in a 3–2 Segunda División B away win against CCD Cerceda.

Gandoy was definitely promoted to the B's ahead of the 2018–19 season, and scored his first senior goal on 4 November 2018 by netting the second in a 2–1 home success over Rápido de Bouzas. He contributed with 24 appearances (18 starts, 1668 minutes of action) as his side suffered relegation.

Gandoy made his first-team debut on 21 September 2019, replacing Ager Aketxe late into a 0–0 away draw against Cádiz CF in the Segunda División. The following 9 September, after Dépors relegation, he renewed his contract for three years and was definitely promoted to the main squad.

References

External links
 
 
 

1999 births
Living people
Spanish footballers
Footballers from A Coruña
Association football midfielders
Deportivo Fabril players
Deportivo de La Coruña players
Segunda División players
Segunda División B players
Tercera División players